Balaenotus is an extinct genus of cetaceans from the Pliocene of Belgium.

Classification
Balaenotus is known only from the type species B. insignis.

References

Fossils of Belgium
Balaenidae
Prehistoric cetacean genera
Fossil taxa described in 1872
Pliocene cetaceans